Jean-Luc Girard (born 22 November 1965) is a French football manager and former player who played as a midfielder in Ligue 1 and Ligue 2 before managing in Ligue 2.

Career
Born in Paris, Girard began playing football with Paris Saint-Germain. After making only one Ligue 1 appearance over two seasons, he joined local rivals Red Star where he would play until the end of his career in 1997.

After he retired from playing, Girard became a football manager, leading his former club Red Star on several occasions. He has also managed amateurs Pau FC, US Sénart-Moissy and US Ivry.

References

External links
Profile at SO FOOT

1965 births
Living people
Association football midfielders
French footballers
French football managers
Paris Saint-Germain F.C. players
Red Star F.C. players
Red Star F.C. managers
Pau FC managers